Taymouth Township is a civil township of Saginaw County in the U.S. state of Michigan. The population was 4,520 at the 2010 Census.

Communities
 Burt is an unincorporated community in the township and is a census-designated place (CDP) for statistical purposes.
 Fosters is an unincorporated community in the township between the two segments of Busch Road west of Huron & Eastern Railway and Dorwood Road, basically consisting of Saginaw Street, Fosters Road, Railroad Street, Hasting Street and Washington Street.
 Morseville is an unincorporated community in the township at Morseville and Burt Roads. The Morseville Bridge over the Flint River is listed on the National Register of Historic Places.
A post office operated here from January 18, 1858, until June 30, 1903.

Geography

Demographics
According to the 2000 census,there were 4,624 people, 1,583 households and 1,296 families residing in the township. The racial make-up of the township was 95.61% White, 0.65% African American, 0.67% Native American, 0.19% Asian, 0.13% Pacific Islander, 0.82% from other races and 1.92% from two or more races. Hispanic or Latino of any race were 3.44% of the population.

There were 1,583 households, out of which 39.7% had children under the age of 18 living with them, 67.8% were married couples living together, 9.2% had a female householder with no husband present and 18.1% were non-families. 14.5% of all households were made up of individuals, and 5.8% had someone living alone who was 65 years of age or older. The average household size was 2.90 and the average family size was 3.20.

28.2% of the population were under the age of 18, 8.5% from 18 to 24, 30.5% from 25 to 44, 24.8% from 45 to 64, and 8.1% were 65 years of age or older. The median age was 35 years. For every 100 females, there were 102.4 males. For every 100 females age 18 and over, there were 99.6 males.

The median household income was $46,581 and the median family income was $51,420. Males had a median income of $41,696 and females $22,458. The per capita income was $18,054. About 6.4% of families and 9.2% of the population were below the poverty line, including 13.7% of those under age 18 and 4.9% of those age 65 or over.

References

Townships in Saginaw County, Michigan
Townships in Michigan